Joanna Trollope  (born 9 December 1943) is an English writer. She has also written under the pseudonym of Caroline Harvey. Her novel Parson Harding's Daughter won in 1980 the Romantic Novel of the Year Award by the Romantic Novelists' Association.

Biography

Early life
Trollope was born on 9 December 1943 in her grandfather's rectory in Minchinhampton, Gloucestershire, England, daughter of Rosemary Hodson and Arthur George Cecil Trollope. Her father was an Oxford University classics graduate who became head of a small building society. Her mother was an artist and writer. Her father was away for war service in India when she was born; he returned when she was three. The family settled in Reigate, Surrey. Trollope has a younger brother and sister. She was educated at Reigate County School for Girls, gaining scholarship to St Hugh's College, Oxford in 1961. She read English.

Her father was of the same family as the Victorian novelist Anthony Trollope; she is his fifth-generation niece, and is a cousin of the writer and broadcaster James Trollope. Of inheriting the name, she has said:

Career
From 1965 to 1967, she worked at the Foreign and Commonwealth Office. While a civil servant, she researched Eastern Europe and the relations between China and the developing world. From 1967 to 1979, she was employed in a number of teaching posts before she became a writer full-time in 1980.

Trollope began writing historical romances under the pseudonym of Caroline Harvey, the first names of her father's parents. She formed the view that: "It was the wrong genre for the time." Encouraged by her second husband, Ian Curteis, she switched to the contemporary fiction for which she has become known. The Choir, published in 1987, was her first contemporary novel. The Rector's Wife, published in 1991, displaced Jeffrey Archer from the top of the hardback bestseller lists. As an explanation, she said in 2006: "except for thrillers there was nothing in the middle ground of the traditional novel, which is where I think I am." In 1992, only Jilly Cooper's Polo and Archer's As the Crow Flies were stronger paperback bestsellers. "I think my books are just the dear old traditional novel making a quiet comeback", she told Geraldine Bedell in a 1993 interview for The Independent on Sunday.

Often described as Aga sagas, for their rural themes, only two of Trollope's novels (by 2006) actually feature an Aga. The term's entry in The Oxford Companion to English Literature (2009) states that "by no means all her work fits the generally comforting implications of the label". Rejecting the label as not being accurate, Trollope told Lisa Allardice, writing for The Guardian in 2006: "Actually, the novels are quite subversive, quite bleak. It's all rather patronising isn't it?" Allardice disputed the "cosy reputation" Trollope's books had acquired as her novels had "tackled increasingly thorny issues including lesbianism, broken families and adoption, the mood growing darker with each novel." Terence Blacker, who coined the term for Trollope's fiction in Publishing News in 1992, admitted a decade later that he "felt terribly guilty" for lumbering Trollope with the phrase. Trollope told Bedell in 1993 that her fiction does "the things the traditional novel has always done" by mirroring reality and exploring "people's emotional lives". Bedell observed that her novels until then were: "never suburban, which is the real condition of most of England. Trollopian action takes place in large village houses, at vast kitchen tables; her doctors, vicars, solicitors and craft-gallery owners may worry about money, as her own parents did, but they don't have any social anxieties: they are invited for drinks at the big house as a matter of course. The books are as economically prestigious, and quite as aspirational in their own way, as the glitter blockbusters of the Eighties."

In 2009, she donated the short story The Piano Man to Oxfam's 'Ox-Tales' project, four collections of UK stories written by 38 authors. Trollope's story was published in the 'Water' collection.
She has written the first novel in Harper Collins updating of the Jane Austen canon, The Austen Project. Her version of "Sense and Sensibility" was published in October 2013 with limited success.

An adaptation of The Rector's Wife (1994), produced for Channel 4, starred Lindsay Duncan and Ronald Pickup. The Choir, adapted by Ian Curteis, was a five-episode BBC  television miniseries in 1995. It starred Jane Asher and James Fox. Of her other novels, A Village Affair and Other People's Children have also been adapted for television.

Reviews
A Spanish Lover: In The New York Times Betsy Groban wrote, ″Her story is filled with lively, astute and always affectionate insights into the abiding issues of marriage, motherhood and materialism, not to mention the destructive power of envy and the importance of living one's own life. ″

Marrying the Mistress:  ″With its sharp eye, light tone and sly, witty pace, Joanna Trollope's ninth novel delivers all the ingredients of romantic comedy, yet ends with a subtle, dark twist.″

Friday Nights: Heather Thompson of The Guardian called Friday Nights "a light but insightful look at a rather conventional cast of characters."

Charlie Lee-Potter, in an article for The Independent, wrote that Brother & Sister:

Personal life
On 14 May 1966, Trollope married a city banker, David Roger William Potter; the couple had two daughters, Antonia and Louise, divorcing in 1983. In 1985, she married the television dramatist Ian Curteis and became a stepmother of his two sons; she and Curteis divorced in 2001. After her second divorce, Trollope moved to West London. She is a grandmother.

Trollope appeared on a 1994 edition of Desert Island Discs. Trollope remarked that men often suggested her books were trivial, to which she liked to respond: "It is a grave mistake to think there is more significance in great things than in little things", paraphrasing Virginia Woolf.

Bibliography

As Joanna Trollope
Some of Joanna Trollope's historical novels are re-edited as Caroline Harvey**

Historical novels
Eliza Stanhope (1978)
Parson Harding's Daughter (1979)**
Leaves from the Valley (1980)**
The City of Gems (1981)**
The Steps of the Sun (1983)**
The Taverner's Place (1986)**

The Austen Project
Sense & Sensibility (2013)

Other novels
The Choir (1988)
A Village Affair (1989)
A Passionate Man (1990)
The Rector's Wife (1991)
The Men and the Girls (1992)
A Spanish Lover (1993)
The Best of Friends (1998)
Next of Kin (1996)
Other People's Children (1998)
Marrying the Mistress (2000)
Girl from the South (2002)
Brother and Sister (2004)
Second Honeymoon (2006)
Friday Nights (2007)
The Other Family (2010)
Daughters-in-Law (2011)
The Soldier's Wife (2012)
Balancing Act (2014)
City of Friends (2017)
An Unsuitable Match (2018)
Mum & Dad (2020)

Non-fiction
Britannia's Daughters: Women of the British Empire (1983)

As Caroline Harvey

Legacy Saga
Legacy of Love (1983)
A Second Legacy (1993)

Historical novels
A Castle in Italy (1993)
The Brass Dolphin (1997)

See also
Aga saga

References

External links

 Joanna Trollope website – features a biography, bibliography, extracts and interviews.
 Joanna Trollope biography from the British Council
 Joanna Trollope discusses The Rector's Wife on the BBC World Book Club
Joanna Trollope at Random House Australia
Interview with Ramona Koval on ABC Radio National's The Book Show about her book Friday Nights.
Interview with Jami Edwards, April 1999, BookReporter.com

1943 births
Living people
20th-century English novelists
21st-century English novelists
English women novelists
20th-century English women writers
21st-century English women writers
Women romantic fiction writers
People from Minchinhampton
Alumni of St Hugh's College, Oxford
RoNA Award winners
Commanders of the Order of the British Empire
Pseudonymous women writers
20th-century pseudonymous writers
21st-century pseudonymous writers